Prunum cahuitaense is a species of sea snail, a marine gastropod mollusk in the family Marginellidae, the margin snails.

Description

Distribution
This species occurs in the Caribbean Sea off Costa Rica.

References

 Magaña, J.; Espinosa, J.; Ortea, J. (2003). Descripción de dos nuevas especies del género Prunum Herrmannsen, 1852 (Mollusca: Gastropoda: Marginellidae) del Caribe y el Pacífico de Costa Rica. Avicennia. 16, 121-128

Marginellidae